Gordexola is a town and municipality located in the province of Biscay, in the autonomous community of Basque Country, northern Spain.

References

External links
 Gordexola in the Bernardo Estornés Lasa - Auñamendi Encyclopedia (Euskomedia Fundazioa) 
 Basque Solidarity / Eusko Alkartasuna Council Member of Gordexola  

Municipalities in Biscay